Hristo Dimitrov may refer to:

 Hristo Dimitrov (gymnast) (born 1991), Bulgarian gymnast
 Hristo Dimitrov (wrestler) (born 1968), Bulgarian Olympic wrestler